Santiago Pierotti (born 3 April 2001) is an Argentine professional footballer who plays as a forward for Colón.

Club career
Pierotti started his career in Colón's ranks; having signed in 2014. He, aged eighteen, appeared for his professional debut on 12 April 2019 in the Copa de la Superliga against Tigre, replacing Marcelo Estigarribia after eighty-four minutes as the first round, first leg ended 0–0.

International career
In July 2019, Pierotti received a call-up from the Argentina U18s for the L'Alcúdia International Tournament in Spain.

Career statistics
.

References

External links

2001 births
Living people
Sportspeople from Buenos Aires Province
Argentine people of Italian descent
Argentine footballers
Association football forwards
Club Atlético Colón footballers